Jargon is the specialized terminology associated with a particular field or area of activity. Jargon is normally employed in a particular communicative context and may not be well understood outside that context. The context is usually a particular occupation (that is, a certain trade, profession, vernacular or academic field), but any ingroup can have jargon. The main trait that distinguishes jargon from the rest of a language is special vocabulary—including some words specific to it and often different senses or meanings of words, that outgroups would tend to take in another sense—therefore misunderstanding that communication attempt. Jargon is sometimes understood as a form of technical slang and then distinguished from the official terminology used in a particular field of activity.

The terms jargon, slang, and argot are not consistently differentiated in the literature; different authors interpret these concepts in varying ways. According to one definition, jargon differs from slang in being secretive in nature; according to another understanding, it is specifically associated with professional and technical circles. Some sources, however, treat these terms as synonymous. In Russian linguistics, jargon is classified as an expressive form of language, while secret languages are referred to as argots. The use of jargon became more popular around the sixteenth century attracting persons from different career paths. This led to there being printed copies available on the various forms of jargon.

Specifics
Jargon is "the technical terminology or characteristic idiom of a special activity or group". Most jargon is technical terminology (technical terms), involving terms of art or industry terms, with particular meaning within a specific industry. A main driving force in the creation of technical jargon is precision and efficiency of communication, when a discussion must easily range from general themes to specific, finely differentiated details without circumlocution. Jargon enriches everyday vocabulary with meaningful content and can potentially become a catchword.

While jargon allows greater efficiency in communication among those familiar with it, a side-effect is that it raises the threshold of comprehensibility for outsiders. This is usually accepted as an unavoidable trade-off, but it may also be used as a means of social exclusion (reinforcing ingroup–outgroup barriers) or social aspiration (when introduced as a way of showing off). Some academics promote the use of jargon-free language, as an audience may be alienated or confused by the technical terminology, and thus lose track of a speaker or writer's broader and more important arguments.

Etymology
The French word is believed to have been derived from the Latin word , meaning "to chatter", which was used to describe speech that the listener did not understand. The word may also come from Old French  meaning "chatter of birds". Middle English also has the verb  meaning "to chatter," or "twittering," deriving from Old French.

The first use of the word dates back to the usage of the word in The Canterbury Tales written by Geoffrey Chaucer between 1387 and 1400. Chaucer referred to jargon as the utterance of birds or sounds resembling birds.

In colonial history, jargon was seen as a device of communication to bridge the gap between two speakers who did not speak the same tongue. Jargon was synonymous with pidgin in naming specific language usages. Jargon then began to have a negative connotation with lacking coherent grammar, or gibberish as it was seen as a "broken" language of many different languages with no full community to call their own. In the 1980s, linguists began restricting this usage of jargon to keep the word to more commonly define a technical or specialized language use.

Fields using the term
The term is used, often interchangeably, with the term buzzword when examining organizational culture. In linguistics, it is used to mean "specialist language," with the term also seen as closely related to slang, argot and cant. Various kinds of language peculiar to ingroups can be named across a semantic field. Slang can be either culture-wide or known only within a certain group or subculture. Argot is slang or jargon purposely used to obscure meaning to outsiders. Conversely, a lingua franca is used for the opposite effect, helping communicators to overcome unintelligibility, as are pidgins and creole languages. For example, the Chinook Jargon was a pidgin. Although technical jargon's primary purpose is to aid technical communication, not to exclude outsiders by serving as an argot, it can have both effects at once and can provide a technical ingroup with shibboleths. For example, medieval guilds could use this as one means of informal protectionism. On the other hand, jargon that once was obscure outside a small ingroup can become generally known over time. For example, the terms bit, byte, and hexadecimal (which are terms from computing jargon) are now recognized by many people outside computer science.

Referenced
The philosopher Étienne Bonnot de Condillac observed in 1782 that "every science requires a special language because every science has its own ideas". As a rationalist member of the Enlightenment, he continued: "It seems that one ought to begin by composing this language, but people begin by speaking and writing, and the language remains to be composed."

Industry term
"An industry term... is a type of technical terminology that has a particular meaning in a specific industry. It implies that a word or phrase is a typical one in a particular industry and people working in the respective industry or business will be familiar with and use the term."

Precise technical terms and their definitions are formally recognized, documented, and taught by educators in the field. Other terms are more colloquial, coined and used by practitioners in the field, and are similar to slang. The boundaries between formal and slang jargon, as in general English, are quite fluid. This is especially true in the rapidly developing world of computers and networking. For instance, the term firewall (in the sense of a device used to filter network traffic) was at first technical slang. As these devices became more widespread and the term became widely understood, the word was adopted as formal terminology.

Technical terminology evolves due to the need for experts in a field to communicate with precision and brevity, but often has the effect of excluding those who are unfamiliar with the particular specialized language of the group. This can cause difficulties as, for example, when a patient is unable to follow the discussions of medical practitioners, and thus cannot understand his own condition and treatment. Differences in jargon also cause difficulties where professionals in related fields use different terms for the same phenomena.

Business Jargon 
The use of jargon in the business world is a common occurrence. The use of jargon in business correspondence reached a high popularity between the late 1800's into the 1950's. Jargon in business is most frequently used in modes of communication especially in business letters and changes as language evolves. Common phrases used in business jargon includes:

 As per
 Ditto
 Hereby
 Meet with your approval
 Oblige
 Please be advised
 Pursuant
 Undersigned

Medical Jargon 
This is another common area that jargon is known to be found.  Medicine is rich in scientific terminology that is used amongst medical professionals. However, these terms when used with patients or non medical professionals has caused issues. Most patients encounter medical jargon when referring to their diagnosis or when receiving or reading their medication.   Some of the most commonly used terms in medical jargon are:

 Ablation
 Biopsied
 Hematoma
 Infarct
 Ketosis
 Papillary carcinoma
 Plantar fasciitis
 sciatica
 Vertebrae

On first glance many people do not understand what these terms mean and may panic when they see these scientific names being used in reference to their health. The argument as to whether medical jargon is a positive or negative attribute to a patients experience has evidence to support both sides. On one hand, as mentioned before these phrases can be overwhelming for some patients who may not understand the terminology. However, with the accessibility to the internet, it has been suggested that these terms can be used and easily researched for clarity.

In practice 
Jargon may serve the purpose of a "gatekeeper" in conversation, signaling who is allowed into certain forms of conversation. Jargon may serve this function by dictating to which direction or depth a conversation about or within the context of a certain field or profession will go. For example, a conversation between two professionals in which one person has little previous interaction or knowledge of the other person could go one of at least two possible ways. One of the professionals (who the other professional does not know) does not use, or does not correctly use the jargon of their respective field, and is little regarded or remembered beyond small talk or fairly insignificant in this conversation. Or, if the person does use particular jargon (showing their knowledge in the field to be legitimate, educated, or of particular significance) the other professional then opens the conversation up in an in-depth or professional manner. Outside of conversation, jargon can become confusing in writing. When used in text, readers can become confused if there are terms used that require outside knowledge on the subject.

Positivity 
Ethos is used to create an appeal to authority. It is one of three pillars of persuasion created by Aristotle to create a logical argument. Ethos uses credibility to back up arguments. It can indicate to the audience that a speaker is an insider with using specialized terms in the field to make an argument based on authority and credibility.

Jargon can be used to convey meaningful information and discourse in a convenient way within communities. A subject expert may wish to avoid jargon when explaining something to a layperson. Jargon may help communicate contextual information optimally. For example, a football coach talking to their team or a doctor working with nurses.

Accessibility and criticism 
With the rise of the self-advocacy movement within the disability movement, "jargonized" language has been much objected to by advocates and self-advocates. Jargon is largely present in everyday language, in newspapers, government documents, and official forms. Several advocacy organizations work on influencing public agents to offer accessible information in different formats. One accessible format that offers an alternative to jargonised language is "easy read", which consists of a combination of plain English and images.

The criticism against jargon can be found in certain fields when responding to specific information. In a study done by analyzing 58 patients and 10 radiation therapists, they diagnosed and explained the treatment of a disease to a patient with the use of jargon. It was found that using jargon in the medical field is not the best in communicating the terminology and concepts. Patients tend to be confused about what the treatments and risks were. There are resources that include online glossaries of technical jargon, also known as "jargon busters."

Examples
Many examples of jargon exist because of its use among specialists and subcultures alike. In the professional world, those who are in the business of filmmaking may use words like "vorkapich" to refer to a montage when talking to colleagues. In Rhetoric, rhetoricians use words like "arete" to refer to a person of power's character when speaking with one another.

Architectural terminology
Ballet terminology
Binomial nomenclature
Blazon (Heraldic terminology)
Business jargon
Chemical nomenclature
Computing jargon
Corporate jargon
Cricket terminology
Economics terminology that differs from common usage
Fencing terminology
Flag terminology
Language of mathematics
Mathematical jargon
Legal terms
Medical terminology
Musical terminology
Nautical terms (A-L)
Nautical terms (M-Z)
Padonkaffsky jargon
Poker terminology
Scientific terminology
International scientific vocabulary
Wine tasting descriptors

See also

Academese
Bullshit
Colloquialism
Cryptolect
Eurodicautom
Gibberish
Idola fori
Jargon File
Legalese
Lexigraf
Nomenclature
Orismology
P convention
Phraseme
Pidgin
Polari
Procedure word
Register (sociolinguistics)
Specification (technical standard)
Technical standard
Thieves' cant
Three-letter acronym
Variety (linguistics)

References

Further reading
 Green, Jonathon. Dictionary of Jargon. London: Routledge & Kegan Paul, 1987. .
 Nash, Walter. Jargon: Its Uses and Abuses. Oxford: Blackwell, 1993. .
 Sonneveld, H., Loenning, K.: (1994): "Introducing terminology", in Terminology, p. 1–6
 Wright, S. E.; Budin, G.: (1997): Handbook of Terminology Management, Volume 1: Basic Aspects of Terminology Management. Amsterdam, Philadelphia: John Benjamins. 370 pp.

External links

 The Jargon Wiki—A wiki based on The Jargon File.
 Business Jargon—Business jargon and terminology
 Jargonism—Business English dictionary for industry-specific jargon

 
Linguistics terminology
Terminology